Winship Point is a point at the west side of the entrance to Potter Cove, King George Island, in the South Shetland Islands. Named by the United Kingdom Antarctic Place-Names Committee (UK-APC) in 1960 for Jonathan Winship, master of the ship O'Cain in 1820–21, operating from Potter Cove.

Headlands of King George Island (South Shetland Islands)
Geography of the British Antarctic Territory